Lalouret-Laffiteau is a commune in the Haute-Garonne department in southwestern France. As of 2017, the population of the town is 134.

Population

See also
 Communes of the Haute-Garonne department

References

Communes of Haute-Garonne